Chowdhury Mazhar Ali (born: 7 August 1970; Popularly known as Shiba Shanu) is a Bangladeshi actor. He is mostly known for his villain role in Cinema of Bangladesh. In 1998, He started his film career as an actor with the film Matrivumi. His notable works as an actor are  Commando, Tungipara'r Miya Bhai, Bir,Abbas, Password, Naqaab, Captain Khan, Chalbaaz, Rangbaz, Premi O Premi, Rajneeti, Mental, Shikari Warning

Filmography

References

External links
 

1974 births
Living people